Pahura, and also spelled Pihur/Pihuru, Pihura, and Pihuru/Pihure was a commissioner of the 1350 BC Amarna letters correspondence. Pahura's name means in Egyptian,  ' the Syrian ' , and he was commissioner to the Egyptian pharaoh.

Pahura is referenced in 9-letters of the Amarna letters corpus. Two damaged partial letters are only topically identified by Pahura's name, with no other references: letters EA 207 and 208, (EA for 'el Amarna').

An example letter (with commissioner Pihura)
The largest sub-corpus of Amarna letters is from the Rib-Haddi corpus: namely Rib-Hadda of Gubla-(Byblos). EA 132, entitled: "The hope for peace" shows some of the intrigues of the 68-letter Rib-Haddi corpus of letters.

EA 132, "The hope for peace"
Letter no. 61 of 68 by Rib-Haddi.
[S]ay [to] the king, my lord, m[y] Sun: Message of Rib-Hadda, your [ser]vant. May the Lady of Gubla grant power to the king, my lord. I fall at the feet of my lord 7 times and 7 times. Moreover, give thought to Gubla, your loyal city. Earlier, 'Abdi-Aširta attacked me, and I wrote to your father, (i.e. Amenhotep III), "Send the royal archers, and the entire land will be taken in a day." Did he not take fo[r himself' 'Abdi-Aširt[a], together with his possessions? Now Aziru has gathered a[ll] the 'Apiru and has said to them, "If Gubla is not ... [...]" [L]ook, Yanhamu being with you, a[sk him] if I did not say to him, "If you make an alliance ... [...] with the sons of 'Abdi-Aširta, they will take you prisoner." He listened t[o me], and he guarded the c[ities] of the king, his lord. I said the same thing to Pawura so he would not listen to the words of Ha'ip, (named for god: Hapy), whose father turned the citi[es] into enemies. Now Ha'ip has hand[ed over] Sumur-(Zemar). May the king not neglect this deed, since a commissioner was killed. If now you are negligent, then Pihura will not stay in Kumidu, and all your [ma]yors will be killed. I keep (wr)iting like this to the pa[lac]e, [but] no attention is paid [t]o me. Send ships to fetch the Lady's property and me. [Sen]d 50–100 men and 50–100 m[en fro]m Meluhha, 50 chariots, [to g]uard [the city] for you. Se[nd] archers and bring peace to the land.  -EA 132, lines 1-59 (lacuna of 3-4 middle sentences)

See also
Rib-Hadda
Haapi, Eyptian commissioner
Yanhamu, Eyptian commissioner
Pawura, Eyptian official
Text corpus

References
Moran, William L. The Amarna Letters. Johns Hopkins University Press, 1987, 1992. (softcover)

Amarna letters officials
Canaanite people
14th-century BC people